Jens Elmegård Rasmussen (15 March 1944 – 15 May 2013) was associate professor of Indo-European Studies and head of the Roots of Europe research center at the University of Copenhagen from its initiation in 2008 until his death. He was an expert on Proto-Indo-European and Indo-European languages in general, especially morphophonemics, but he also published articles on the history of Eskimo–Aleut languages and linguistic diachrony. He supported the Indo-Uralic and Eurasiatic hypotheses.

Elmegård Rasmussen was the leading editor of the international scholarly journal Tocharian and Indo-European Studies (TIES) and chief editor of the book series Copenhagen Studies in Indo-European. He was married to the Danish Indo-Europeanist Birgit Anette Olsen.

Selected publications
 1979, Anaptyxis, gemination and syncope in Eskimo: A diachronic study. Copenhagen: Copenhagen Linguistic Circle.
 1989, Studien zur Morphophonemik der Indogermanischen Grundsprache. Innsbruck: Innsbrucker Beiträge zur Sprachwissenschaft.
 1999, Selected Papers on Indo-European Linguistics. Copenhagen: Museum Tusculanum Press.

References

External links 
 Official website (in English)

1944 births
2013 deaths
Linguists from Denmark
Linguists of Indo-European languages
Historical linguists